Sutheaswari Mudukasan (born 1985) is a badminton player from Malaysia. She was part of the national women's team that won the bronze medal at the 2005 Southeast Asian Games. She played at the 2005 World Badminton Championships in the women's singles event, survived the first round before losing to Li Li of Singapore in the second round.

References 
 http://www.tournamentsoftware.com/find.aspx?a=8&oid=209B123F-AA87-41A2-BC3E-CB57133E64CC&q=50153

1985 births
Living people
Malaysian people of Tamil descent
Malaysian sportspeople of Indian descent
Malaysian female badminton players
Competitors at the 2005 Southeast Asian Games
Southeast Asian Games bronze medalists for Malaysia
Southeast Asian Games medalists in badminton
21st-century Malaysian women